The 2nd Tactical Wing is a wing in the Air Component of the Belgian Armed Forces based at Florennes air base in the Southern French speaking part of Belgium near the (small) city of Dinant. It comprises the 1st Squadron and the 350th Squadron of the Air Component. The 2nd Squadron (disbanded & absorbed in 350th Squadron) had the famous patch/logo of a red comet

External links
Section of the website of the Belgian Ministry of Defence about the 2nd Tactical Wing

Tactical Wing, 2